Mońki  is a town in northeastern Poland and, as of 1999, is situated in the Podlaskie Voivodeship. From 1975 to 1998 it was part of the Białystok Voivodeship (1975–1998). It is the capital of Mońki County.

History 
In the 16th century, Mońki was a village owned by the Mońko family. In the 19th century, when building railroad from Grodno was in progress, in the neighborhood of Mońki a train station was built. After the First World War a Catholic church was built. In the late World War II Germans destroyed the church. After the war, in 1954, the village was adopted as capital of the Mońki county. That increased development of the village and in 1965 Mońki became a city. In 1975 the county was deleted, but it returned in 1999 (1998).

Symbols 
Mońki's coat of arms presents a lady with potatoes. It is connected with an old type of farming in Mońki village and it neighbourhood. In city (also in 2012) was organised a day of potato.

Many of Mońki's inhabitants have moved abroad, particularly to the US, so they can send remittances to their families.

Economy 
In Mońki existed especially food enterprises. The largest is Moniecka Spółdzielnia Mleczarska (dairy).

Education 
In Mońki existed two primary school (one connected with first grade music school), gymnasium. general liceum, technikum and szkoła zawodowa.

Transport 
Through Mońki goes droga krajowa 65 (road), connecting city with Białystok and Grajewo.

Export 

Several tech companies have risen during the last 10 years.

Tourism 
Near Mońki there are some of the greatest swamps in Europe, the Biebrza River Swamps, and in 1993 the government created the Biebrza National Park (BNP) to recognise and protect their unique nature. The Biebrza River Swamps are an important habitat for rare birds such as the ruff (pol. batalion), which is a symbol of the BNP.

Notable people
Maria Janion (1926-2020), literary critic and feminist
Józef Piotr Klim (born 1960), politician
Katarzyna Żakowicz (born 1975), shot putter

Gallery

References

 
Cities and towns in Podlaskie Voivodeship
Grodno Governorate
Białystok Voivodeship (1919–1939)
Belastok Region